Petter Jonas Granberg (born 27 August 1992) is a Swedish professional ice hockey player. He is currently playing with Skellefteå AIK in the Swedish Hockey League (SHL). Granberg was drafted 116th overall by the Toronto Maple Leafs in the 2010 NHL Entry Draft.

Playing career
On 13 April 2014, Granberg made his NHL debut skating for the Toronto Maple Leafs during a 1–0 loss to the Ottawa Senators.

Prior to the 2015–16 season, Granberg suffered an off-season injury, requiring surgery for a torn achilles. Nearing a return to playing after a four-month rehabilitation, Granberg was placed on waivers by the Maple Leafs. On 22 November 2015, Granberg was claimed off waivers by the Nashville Predators.

In the 2017–18 season, Granberg was assigned by the Predators to continue playing for the duration of the campaign with their AHL affiliate, the Milwaukee Admirals. Unable to make an NHL appearance in his third season within the Predators organization, Granberg left as an impending restricted free agent to sign a three-year contract with his former Swedish team, Skellefteå AIK, on 18 May 2018.

Career statistics

Regular season and playoffs

International

Awards and honours

References

External links

1992 births
Living people
IF Sundsvall Hockey players
Milwaukee Admirals players
Nashville Predators players
People from Gällivare Municipality
Skellefteå AIK players
Sportspeople from Norrbotten County
Swedish expatriate ice hockey players in Canada
Swedish ice hockey defencemen
Toronto Maple Leafs draft picks
Toronto Maple Leafs players
Toronto Marlies players